Parker High School can refer to:

Parker High School (Alabama), Birmingham, Alabama
Parker High School (Arizona), Parker, Arizona
Parker School, Kamuela, Hawaii
Parker High School (Illinois), Chicago, Illinois
William Parker High School, Howell, Michigan
Parker High School (South Dakota), Parker, South Dakota
George S. Parker High School, Janesville, Wisconsin